Escadrille 31 of the French Air Force was founded at the beginning of the World War I, on 24 September 1914, at Dijon Air Base. Once equipped with Morane-Saulnier Ns, it was posted to I Armee of the French Army.

History
In February 1915, Escadrille MS 31 was moved to defense of Verdun. In April 1915, it returned to I Armee; on the 26th, it began re-equipping with Nieuport 10 two-seaters. By January 1916, the Escadrille 31 had rearmed with ten single-seater Nieuport 11s. When the unit acquired Lieutenant de Villeneuve as commander in mid April, he instituted the use of a Roman archer as the escadrille insignia. In October, Escadrille N 31 shifted to support II Armee. The following month, the unit was incorporated into Groupe de Combat II. Escadrille 31 began receiving SPADs on 7 January 1917. However, it would not totally rearm with SPADs until 17 September, when it was renamed Escadrille SPA 31.

The escadrille would serve as part of GC II through the remainder of the war. When the armistice came, it had been credited with 42 aircraft and four observation balloons destroyed, and have earned two citations from Army Corps.

Commanding officers
 Capitaine Raymond Yence: 24 September 1914 – ca 4 January 1915
 Capitaine Guy-Leopold Hautschamps: 5 January 1915 – died in accident ca 11 May 1915
 Capitaine Louis Mathieu: 12 May 1915 – KIA 22 September 1915
 Lieutenant Alfred Auger: 23 September 1915 – 16 April 1916
 Lieutenant Lucien Couret de Villeneuve: 17 April 1916 – 16 July 1917
 Capitaine Charles Dupuy: 17 July 1917 -
 Lieutenant Paul Reverchon: 6 May 1918 – 29 September 1918
 Lieutenant Richard de Frescheville – 30 September 1918

Notable personnel
 Lieutenant Jacques Ortoli
 Adjutant Georges Blanc
 Sous Lieutenant Jules Covin
 Sous Lieutenant François Portron

Aircraft
 Morane-Saulnier N: 24 September 1914
 Nieuport 18 two-seaters: 26 April 1915
 Nieuport 11: early January 1916
 SPAD: First received 7 January 1917

Endnotes

References 
 Franks, Norman; Frank W. Bailey. Over the Front: A Complete Record of the Fighter Aces and Units of the United States and French Air Services, 1914-1918 Grub Street, 1992. , .

Further reading 
 Bailey, Frank W., and Christophe Cony. French Air Service War Chronology, 1914-1918: Day-to-Day Claims and Losses by French Fighter, Bomber and Two-Seat Pilots on the Western Front. London: Grub Street, 2001.
 Davilla, James J., and Arthur M. Soltan. French Aircraft of the First World War. Stratford, CT: Flying Machines Press, 1997.

 Les escadrilles de l'aéronautique militaire française: symbolique et histoire, 1912-1920. Vincennes: Service historique de l'armée de l'air, 2004.

External links
 Escadrille MS 31 - N 31 - SPA 31 

French Air and Space Force squadrons